Phủ Lý is the capital city of Hà Nam Province of Vietnam 60 km south of Hanoi on the river Đáy.

History

Phủ Lý was taken by the French canonnière l'Espingole and 28 men captained by Adrien-Paul Balny d'Avricourt on October 26 1873, shortly before Balny's death together with Francis Garnier at Hanoi's West Gate.

In the aftermath of World War II, Phủ Lý was where a significant number of VNQDĐ leaders were captured by the Việt Minh in 1946. The city was attacked by retreating French forces on June 30 1954, shortly before the country was liberated. 

It was almost completely destroyed by the Americans in five days of bombing between July 14 and November 5, 1966.

Michael Maclear writes of the area afterwards as 'a wasteland without life':

"The inhabitants would have had no warning of the rain of bombs. Squadrons of B-52s flying six miles high, unseen and unheard, would systematically obliterate sections of their target, day after day. Unlike Hanoi, which was ringed with Soviet SAM missiles, here in the rural areas there was no adequate defense."

Gallery

References

Cities in Vietnam
Districts of Hà Nam province
Provincial capitals in Vietnam
Populated places in Hà Nam province